The United States Conference of Mayors (USCM) is the official non-partisan organization of cities with populations of 30,000 or more. The cities are each represented by their mayors or other chief elected officials. The organization was founded in light of the Great Depression and was formed under Herbert Hoover until its original charter was signed at the Mayflower Hotel in Washington, D.C., on the eve of the inauguration of Franklin D. Roosevelt.

The organization is part of the "Big Seven", a group of organizations that represent local and state governments in the United States.

Mission

The organization serves the following functions: Help develop and promote effective national urban/suburban policy; build stronger and more effective federal-city relationships; monitor the effectiveness of federal policy in terms of its service to urban needs; help mayors develop leadership and management tools; and to create a forum in which mayors can share ideas and information. By representing all large municipalities and their leaders in these ways, the conference is speaking for vast majority of the components of the nations economy. According to one of the Conference's own reports, metropolitan areas accounted for 84 percent of the nation's gross domestic product and at the same time generated 84 percent of the nation's employment opportunities.

History

In 1932, Mayor of Detroit Frank Murphy called a conference of mayors to meet in Detroit, Michigan, in June. In the shadow of the depression, he felt it was worthwhile to pursue federal aid for cities. Forty-eight mayors of cities in excess of 100,000 attended. On June 3, two days after the Adjournment sine die of the first conference, Murphy appointed a seven-person commission (including himself) to lobby Washington using the powers vested in him by the conference.  Murphy along with Mayor of Boston James Michael Curley, Mayor of Cleveland Ray T. Miller, Mayor of Milwaukee Daniel Hoan, Mayor of New Orleans T. Semmes Walmsley, Mayor of Minneapolis William A. Anderson, and Mayor of Grand Rapids George W. Welsh traveled to Washington, D.C., to lobby the federal government for aid. The mayors that went with him urgently pleaded for relief. On June 6 at 10:00 a.m., they met with United States Speaker of the House John Nance Garner (D), Majority Leader of the United States House of Representatives Henry T. Rainey (D) and Minority Leader of the United States House of Representatives Bertrand H. Snell (R). They held out hope for a US$5 billion prosperity loan, but made it clear their true need for any relief for the despair of their constituents. At 11:00 a.m., they met with United States Vice President/President of the United States Senate Charles Curtis and other Senate leaders. The presence of the Mayors was unprecedented and despite some Democratic defections, a band of 12 Republicans led by Fiorello LaGuardia enabled the passage of a relief bill by a 205–189 margin. Unfortunately for the mayors, President Herbert Hoover was not receptive to the $1.9 billion scale of the public works plan. However, the mayors were able to convince the President that federal support for local relief efforts was reasonable and this is considered a watershed event. 42 of the 48 states benefited from the newly empowered Reconstruction Finance Corporation. After the Emergency Relief and Construction Act of 1932 was signed into law by Hoover, the Conference wrote its charter at the Mayflower Hotel on the eve of the inauguration of Franklin D. Roosevelt. It held its second meeting in 1933 and formed the permanent United States Conference of Mayors with Murphy as its president.

In 1972, USCM President Mayor of Milwaukee Henry Maier led the crusade for municipal resources at a time when federal grants to state and local governments was escalating rapidly. Richard Nixon started allowing cities to participate in federal revenue sharing. This source of municipal funding relieved cities until the mid-1980s. Jimmy Carter capped revenue payments and Reagan discontinued everything except for CDBGs. The CDBG program has consistently allocated over $4 billion/year to state and local jurisdictions. Currently, CDBG's are being used by 1180 local governments and states. Using provisions in the 1995 Crime Bill, President Bill Clinton paid for municipal enforcement authorities on behalf of cities.

Current issues
During the Presidential transition of Barack Obama in December 2008, The Conference held a news conference along with United States House Committee on Ways and Means Chairman Charlie Rangel, United States House Transportation and Infrastructure Committee Chairman James Oberstar and Congressional Urban Caucus Chairman Chaka Fattah. Los Angeles Mayor Antonio Villaraigosa announced that the meeting sought support of the Conferences survey of 11,391 "ready-to-go" infrastructure projects that they hoped to see in a Main Street recovery plan during Obama's first 100 days. According to New York City Mayor Michael Bloomberg, the $73.1 billion projects had completed the design and approval process and met all political requirement except for the need for funding. At the same time the American Association of State Highway and Transportation Officials called for support for more 5,148 road and bridge infrastructure projects that they categorized as "ready-to-go." Many of the ideas in the mayor proposal became part of the stimulus package.

Another issue that the Conference took issue with in 2008 include the misappropriation of federal funds for municipal anti-terrorism emergency equipment through the Homeland Security Department, which was created in 2003, instead of for municipal police forces and other enforcement officials. On this issue, they stood by the International Association of Chiefs of Police who feel common domestic anti-crime expenditure might better serve the public interest. Since the September 11 attacks federally funded municipal purchases of bomb robots, chem-bio suits and other anti-terrorism equipment have often gone unused while crime is underserved. These organizations are calling for a re-evaluation of the federal grant system. Along with various foreign governments, United States Chamber of Commerce and the Travel Industry Association, the conference also stood against the 2008 Homeland Security Department initiative to fingerprint foreign visitors before they leave the country by airplane. These complaints came a few years after the conference complained that their cities were not receiving an equitable proportion of counterterrorism funding in the first few years after the attacks.

The conference has been active in fighting foreclosures and predatory lending. During the formulation and debate of the Emergency Economic Stabilization Act of 2008 in response to the global financial crisis of 2008, a conference spokesperson was cited for being in support of the inclusion of $4 billion for the purchase, rehabilitation and resale of low- and moderate-income family distressed property. The money would produce profits that would be used to develop neighborhoods. Another important feature to municipalities was $180 million devoted to grants for pre-foreclosure and legal counseling.

Also in 2008, the conference unanimously both supported single-payer national health insurance and City-coordinated drug overdose prevention efforts. After calling for a study on bottled water in 2007, in 2008, the conference came out against bottled water which consumes 1.5 million barrels of oil per year to produce its plastic bottles.

In 2009, the conference adopted a sweeping proposal for lesbian and gay equality by mayors Christopher Cabaldon, Sam Adams, and David Cicilline, making it the first national organization of American elected officials to call for marriage equality, passage of ENDA, and the repeal of Don't ask, don't tell.

In 2013, the conference adopted a resolution urging the federal government to give states leeway in establishing marijuana policies. "Voters in states and cities that wish to break the stranglehold of organized crime over the distribution and sale of marijuana in their communities by legalizing, regulating and taxing marijuana should have the option of doing so," stated Mayor Stephen H. Cassidy of San Leandro, California.

In 2020, in part of the response to the COVID-19 pandemic, the conference requested $250 billion in federal spending directly to cities to counteract the 88% shortfall in city revenues across the country.

Activities
The organization convenes for its winter meeting each January in Washington, D.C., and an Annual Meeting each June in a different U.S. city in addition to ad hoc meetings. At the annual meeting, members vote on policy resolutions. The results are distributed to the President of the United States and the United States Congress.

On January 11, 2007, the Conference leadership approved the annual ten-point platform called "Strong Cities, Strong Families for a Strong America", including positions on energy policy and homeland security, and support for Community development block grants (CDBG), government sponsored enterprises, the State Children's Health Insurance Program (CHIPS), and the Workforce Investment Act. In 2008, travel and tourism were part of the plan for the first time.

In the past, the Conference has taken stances against Ronald Reagan's 1983 budget. It has also through its president Fiorello La Guardia, spoken against cuts in the Works Progress Administration on behalf of Franklin D. Roosevelt. The conference has actively pursued legislation to curb handgun violence by changing the regulations for purchasing, adding regulatory oversight, and suing manufacturers for unreasonable marketing practices and lax safety standards.

At times, the unified voice of Mayors has had significant impact on federal policies. An example was the controversy over the decision by investigators from the United States Department of Housing and Urban Development, Federal Bureau of Investigation and the United States Department of Justice to carry out an examination of waste, fraud and abuse in the housing programs in three cities led by black mayors (Kurt L. Schmoke, Marc H. Morial and Willie L. Brown Jr.). Eventually, the housing subcommittee of the United States House Committee on Appropriations Chairman, Jerry Lewis, in response into the collective voice of the mayors, with the support of President Bill Clinton and Andrew M. Cuomo, the United States Secretary of Housing and Urban Development, mandated a clarification of selection criteria for investigation subjects.

In determining their positions and policies, the Conference has had to balance difficult political choices. They once opposed the Environmental Protection Agency in a resolution which came out against enforcing stricter smog and soot limits. The conference members felt that the stricter standards for ozone and fine particles would have hampered the economies of many municipalities, especially those that are steel-, automobile- and fossil fuel-intensive.

Locales of annual meetings
|title = List of locations of annual meetings
|titlestyle = background:#8edbd1;width:80%
}}

Annual awards and grants
The U.S. Conference of Mayors also houses the Mayors Climate Protection Center, created in 2007 to support mayors in their efforts to reduce the effects of climate change on American cities. In June 2007, the Center awarded its first annual "Mayors' Climate Protection Awards" to leading mayors. The "U.S. Mayors Climate Protection Agreement", initiated by Seattle Mayor Greg Nickels in 2005, seeks the pledges of mayors from all 50 states to take action to reduce greenhouse gas emissions by 7% from 1990 levels by the year 2012, in line with the Kyoto Protocol. As of February 2010, 1017 mayors have signed the Agreement. In 2007, the mayors called for a multibillion-dollar grant to help cities fight global warming and declared global warming as first on their list of top-ten priorities. That year the conference and the city of Seattle hosted the "2007 Mayors Climate Protection Summit in Seattle", which featured Bill Clinton and Al Gore. Wal-Mart has been a corporate partner in the presentation of the first two years of these awards.

The conference has granted City Livability Awards since 1979 for mayors and governments as recognition for developing programs that enhance the quality of life in urban areas. Programs such as drowning awareness and prevention programs earn such recognitions.

Since 1997, the Conference of Mayors in conjunction with the Americans for the Arts has annually presented Public Leadership in the Arts Awards. The awards recognize "elected officials and artists or arts organizations that have demonstrated outstanding leadership in the advancement of the arts." Various classes of elected officials are recognized and various types of contributions are recognized each year.

The Conference has advocated for HIV/AIDS Prevention Grants Programs. Annually, in cooperation with the U.S. Centers for Disease Control and Prevention (CDC) it awards approximately hundreds of thousands of dollars in grants for HIV/AIDS prevention service to Native Americans as well as to African American or Hispanic Women at High Risk of HIV Infection. This was part of a broader 24-year partnership with the CDC in which the conference has awarded $23 million in grants to community-based organizations and local health departments to promote local prevention and education efforts.

Organization

Task forces
Temporary task forces are organized to study emerging issues and make recommendations to the body of the Conference. Prior task forces have addressed AIDS, hunger and homelessness, unfunded federal mandates, youth crime and violence, high fuel costs, and brownfields.

Standing committees
The organizations members serve on the Conference's standing committee which recommend policies for the general body to evaluate for endorsement at the summer meetings. The endorsed policies are delivered to the United States President and United States Congress. The Conference supports initiatives such as handgun regulation, recycling, defense funding and global warming. Although the organization is domestic, its reach is international. It partakes in missions to worldwide locations. When the internet blossomed and President Bill Clinton made plans for an unregulated and untaxed electronic marketplace, state and local officials objected. Their voice was represented by the Conference. Mayors may also serve on one or more of the Conference's standing committees: Children, Health and Human Services; Community Development and Housing; Criminal and Social Justice; Energy; Environment; International Affairs; Jobs, Education and the Workforce; Membership; Tourism, Arts, Parks, Entertainment and Sports; Transportation and Communications; and Urban Economic Policy.

Presidents
The following is a comprehensive listing of presidents of the United States Conference of Mayors:

Controversies
The organization has had some controversies. In Newark, New Jersey, one of its non-partisan presidential straw polls was determined to be contrary to a New Jersey Supreme Court ruling because the court had determined that it was improper for any municipality to test public opinion on an area outside of its jurisdiction.

In 2002, protests by about 3000 people against corporate financing of the U.S. Conference of Mayors was met by arrests and the barricading of much of downtown Madison, Wisconsin, by then Mayor Sue Bauman.

Also, at the 2004 Democratic National Convention, striking Boston Police Department officers decided to picket a Conference of Mayors meeting. 2004 Democratic presidential nominee John Kerry, who was the invited speaker, decided to honor the picket line.

See also
National League of Cities
Mayors Against Illegal Guns Coalition
National Governors Association
National Conference of Black Mayors
C40 Cities Climate Leadership Group
United Cities and Local Governments
 Association internationale des maires francophones
 Global Parliament of Mayors
 List of mayors of the 50 largest cities in the United States

Notes

Further reading

 Flanagan, Richard M. "Roosevelt, Mayors and the New Deal Regime: The Origins of Intergovernmental Lobbying and Administration," Polity, 31:3 (Spring 1999), pp. 415–450.

 as cited at Charles Kolb, Review of "The American Mayor"

External links
 Official web site
 Mayors' Climate Protection Center

Organizations based in Washington, D.C.
Organizations established in 1932
Government-related professional associations in the United States
1932 establishments in Michigan